Katrina and the Waves were a British rock band widely known for the 1985 hit "Walking on Sunshine". They also won the 1997 Eurovision Song Contest with the song "Love Shine a Light".

History

Pre-history (1975–1980)
The band's earliest incarnation was as the Waves, a group that played in and around Cambridge, from 1975 to 1977. The Waves featured guitarist Kimberley Rew and drummer Alex Cooper. This incarnation of the Waves did not issue any recordings, and broke up when Rew left to join the Soft Boys.

A more direct ancestor of Katrina and the Waves was the band Mama's Cookin', a pop cover band from Feltwell. This band, founded in 1978, featured American Katrina Leskanich on vocals and keyboards, and fellow American, Vince de la Cruz on vocals and lead guitar. By late 1980, Alex Cooper had joined the band on drums, with Bob Jakins on bass. Mama's Cookin' proceeded to gig steadily in England over the next two years, specialising in covers of songs by American acts such as Heart, Foreigner, Linda Ronstadt and ZZ Top.

Early days as The Waves (1981–1982)
When The Soft Boys broke up in 1981, Rew contacted his old Wave-mate Cooper to see about renewing their musical partnership. Cooper convinced Rew to join Mama's Cookin', and the five-piece group (Leskanich/Rew/Cooper/de la Cruz/Jakins) was quickly renamed the Waves after the band Rew and Cooper had been in together in the mid-1970s.

The Waves were initially fronted by singer/songwriter/guitarist Rew, who brought a wealth of original material to the band. Leskanich, meanwhile, originally only sang lead vocals on the cover tunes in the band's repertoire. However, over the first year of the Waves' existence, Rew began to write material for Leskanich to sing, and she was soon the primary vocalist.

The Waves made their initial recorded appearances on a 1982 single ("The Nightmare"/"Hey, War Pig!"); both tracks were included on the 1982 Rew solo album called The Bible of Bop. The Waves then issued their debut EP Shock Horror! later in 1982. Around this time, bassist Jakins left the band, and de la Cruz took over on bass.  Now a quartet, the Waves issued the single "Brown Eyed Son" in the UK in August 1982 before permanently renaming themselves Katrina and the Waves.

Early Canadian success (1983–1984)
In early 1983, the fledgling band recorded, at their own expense, an album of their original material designed to be sold at gigs. Rew wrote all the songs on this album, and Leskanich sang eight of the album's 10 tracks. (Rew sang lead on the other two.)

The album was shopped around to various labels, but only Attic Records in Canada responded with an offer. Consequently, although they were based in England, Katrina and the Waves' first album Walking on Sunshine was only released in Canada.

The album garnered enough critical attention and radio play (especially for the title track) to merit a Canadian tour. In 1984, the group released a follow-up album in Canada (Katrina and the Waves 2), with Leskanich now handling all the lead vocals. Rew was still the primary songwriter, but de la Cruz was also responsible for a few songs, including the Canadian airplay hit "Mexico".

Also in 1984, the band received their first ever airplay on BBC Radio 1 when DJ Richard Skinner played the track "Que te quiero", whilst their song "Going Down to Liverpool" was covered by the Bangles, which added to their profile. With the group building a fan base with their recordings and extensive touring, major label interest began to build, and Katrina and the Waves eventually signed an international deal with Capitol Records in 1985.

"Walking on Sunshine" and international success (1985–1989)
For the first Capitol album, the band re-recorded, remixed, or overdubbed 10 songs from their earlier Canadian releases to create their self-titled international debut album in 1985.

The Katrina and the Waves album was a substantial critical and commercial success, and the group had a worldwide hit with the song "Walking on Sunshine," (no. 9 US, no. 8 UK, a completely re-recorded, and substantially rearranged version of the song when compared to its initial 1983 Canada-only release). A Grammy award nomination for Best New Artist followed, as did constant touring, both of which helped to spur moderate sales of new releases.

A follow-up single to "Walking on Sunshine" called "Do You Want Crying" (written by de la Cruz) also became a top 40 US hit, reaching no. 37 in the late summer of 1985.

However, the band's follow-up album to Katrina and the Waves (simply entitled Waves) did not meet with the same measure of success, either critically or commercially. Rew wrote only two of the 10 songs on the album; de la Cruz and Leskanich wrote the rest. Drummer Cooper, interviewed some years later, claimed "It was (a) mistake when we started taking over from Kimberley in the musical contribution side. The second Capitol album was awful".
 
The album did spin off a minor UK and US hit in the form of the Rew-penned "Is That It?" (no. 70 US, no. 82 UK), and "Sun Street" (a de la Cruz composition) was a UK top 30 hit in 1986. However, Capitol dropped the band after the Waves album.

The band subsequently recorded a 1989 album for Capitol-distributed SBK Records called Break of Hearts, a harder, more rock-oriented effort than their previous releases. The album included "That's the Way" which reached no. 16 in the US (credited to Leskanich/Rew), but subsequent singles, including "Rock 'n' Roll Girl", failed to chart, and the band once again were dropped from their label.

Downturn and surprise comeback winning Eurovision (1990–1997)
Throughout the 1990s, Katrina and the Waves recorded fairly steadily, though most releases were available only in continental Europe and/or Canada, and they issued no charting singles. They also recorded the song "We Gotta Get Out of This Place" with Eric Burdon for the TV series China Beach in 1990.

On 3 May 1997, the band won the 1997 Eurovision Song Contest for the United Kingdom with the song "Love Shine a Light". The song won by a then-record margin of 70 points over the Irish runner-up. "Love Shine a Light" became Katrina and the Waves' biggest-ever UK hit, peaking at no. 3 in the UK Singles Chart.

In a 2020 interview, Katrina Leskanich revealed that, as an American national winning the Eurovision Song Contest for the UK, she was the target of criticism, with some people arguing that UK should have instead sent an English singer to the contest; she also claimed she was asked if she could "try and talk like an English person".

Dissolution (1998–1999)
Despite their return to the public eye in the UK, Katrina and the Waves were not able to follow up "Love Shine a Light" with another hit, and Leskanich left the group in 1998 after several disagreements within the band. Legal wrangling followed, preventing Leskanich from using the band name. Though attempts were made by the Waves to find a new "Katrina" to front the group, the three remaining group members eventually dissolved the band to pursue individual careers in 1999.

Impact of Hurricane "Katrina" (2005)
When Hurricane Katrina and its storm surge devastated much of the U.S. Gulf Coast on 29 August 2005, the MSNBC news program Countdown with Keith Olbermann dubbed its coverage of the storm "Katrina and the Waves"; the name also appeared in numerous headlines and blog postings. A New York Times reporter contacted Katrina Leskanich, who said: "The first time I opened the paper and saw 'Katrina kills 9,' it was a bit of a shock...I hope that the true spirit of 'Walking on Sunshine' will prevail. I would hate for the title to be tinged with sadness, and I will have to do my own part to help turn that around." She also stated that she hoped that "Walking on Sunshine" would become an anthem for the Gulf Coast's recovery.

Later years (2010–2013)
2010 marked the 25th anniversary of the release of "Walking on Sunshine" and a series of back-catalogue reissues and a re-recorded version of the track were released. A free download of one of the tracks from Kimberley Rew's solo album The Bible of Bop was given away in March 2010 from the band's website. Katrina Leskanich released The Live Album in July 2010 – a mix of Katrina and the Waves hits and new songs recorded in London and Germany.

In June 2011, the group threatened legal action against U.S. presidential candidate Michele Bachmann for playing their music on her campaign trail. A statement on the group's official website reads: "Katrina and the Waves would like it to be known that they do not endorse the use of "Walking on Sunshine" by Michele Bachmann and have instructed their lawyers accordingly." Leskanich stated that she wants to ban the Republican party from using the track because she does not agree with her politics.

In July 2013, Leskanich performed at the San Fermín festival in Spain for the penultimate gig of the season on Plaza del Castillo.

Members 
 Katrina Leskanich – vocals, rhythm guitar
 Kimberley Rew – lead guitar
 Vince de la Cruz – bass guitar
 Alex Cooper – drums

Discography

Studio albums

Compilation albums
 The Best Of (1991, Attic)
 Roses (1995, Polydor) (Canadian release only – compiles tracks from Edge of the Land and Turn Around)
 Anthology (1995, One Way Records / CEMA Special Markets)
 Katrina and the Waves / Waves (1996, BGO)
 Walking on Sunshine – The Greatest Hits of Katrina and the Waves (1997, EMI)
 The Original Recordings 1983 – 1984 (2003, Bongo Beat) (includes Walking on Sunshine, Katrina and the Waves 2, and bonus tracks)

Singles

Note
The Capitol versions of "Que Te Quiero" and "Red Wine and Whiskey" were released as a double A-side in the UK following "Walking on Sunshine" and "Do You Want Crying?".

References

External links 
 Kimberley Rew official website
 Katrina Leskanich official website

Musical groups established in 1981
Musical groups disestablished in 1999
English pop music groups
English rock music groups
English new wave musical groups
Eurovision Song Contest entrants of 1997
Eurovision Song Contest winners
Eurovision Song Contest entrants for the United Kingdom
Female-fronted musical groups
Musical groups from Cambridge
Attic Records (Canada) artists
Capitol Records artists
1981 establishments in England